Jeffrey Hoke Brantley (born September 5, 1963) is an American former professional baseball relief pitcher who played in Major League Baseball (MLB) for 14 seasons, from  to . Brantley currently is a broadcaster for the Cincinnati Reds.

Early career
Brantley lettered in three sports at W. A. Berry High School (which was replaced by Hoover High School). Brantley also was the quarterback on Berry state championship football team.

Brantley played college baseball at Mississippi State University, where he was a teammate of Will Clark, Rafael Palmeiro and Bobby Thigpen on a Bulldogs team that participated in the 1985 College World Series. He is the co-holder of the SEC record for career wins by a pitcher with 45, along with University of South Carolina and Pittsburgh Pirates pitcher Kip Bouknight.

Major league career
Brantley played for the San Francisco Giants, Cincinnati Reds, St. Louis Cardinals and Philadelphia Phillies, all of the National League, and the Texas Rangers of the American League. He was a member of the 1989 Giants that defeated the Chicago Cubs to win the National League pennant and eventually lost to the Oakland A's in the World Series. In the World Series, he pitched in three games with an ERA of 4.15.

In 2010, he was inducted into the Mississippi Sports Hall of Fame.

Broadcasting career
Brantley was a color commentator for ESPN broadcasts of Major League Baseball games and an in-studio contributor for Baseball Tonight from 2002 through 2006. In 2007, he joined the radio broadcast team of the Cincinnati Reds on the Cincinnati Reds Radio Network, led by flagship station WLW, joining Marty Brennaman and Thom Brennaman and the FSN Ohio television broadcast team with Chris Welsh and George Grande.

Personal
Brantley and his wife, Ashley have two children, while he also has two children from a previous marriage.

Brantley is a devout Christian. While with the Giants, Brantley and teammates Scott Garrelts, Atlee Hammaker and Dave Dravecky became known as the "God Squad" because of their strong Christian faith. Foregoing the hard-partying lifestyle of many of their teammates, they preferred to hold Bible studies in their hotel rooms while on the road.

See also
List of Major League Baseball annual saves leaders

References

External links

Jeff Brantley at Baseball Almanac

1963 births
Living people
Arkansas Travelers players
Baseball players from Alabama
Cincinnati Reds announcers
Cincinnati Reds players
Clearwater Phillies players
Fresno Giants players
Major League Baseball broadcasters
Major League Baseball pitchers
Mississippi State Bulldogs baseball players
National League All-Stars
National League saves champions
Sportspeople from Florence, Alabama
People from Hoover, Alabama
Philadelphia Phillies players
Phoenix Firebirds players
San Francisco Giants players
St. Louis Cardinals players
Scranton/Wilkes-Barre Red Barons players
Shreveport Captains players
Texas Rangers players
All-American college baseball players
Mat-Su Miners players